The African Youth Games  is an international multi-sport event held every four years to complement the current Africa Games. The first games was hosted by Rabat, Morocco.
This international sportive event has been created by Lassana Palenfo, current director of the Association of National Olympic Committees of Africa. The idea came in 2006, but the first African Youth Games only occurred in 2010.

Editions

See also
African Games
Tunisia at the 2010 African Youth Games

References

External links
Support Gaborone 2014 games – Botswana Daily News

 
African international sports competitions
Quadrennial sporting events
Multi-sport events in Africa
Recurring sporting events established in 2010
2010 establishments in Africa
Youth multi-sport events